In algebra, a homomorphism is a structure-preserving map between two algebraic structures of the same type (such as two groups, two rings, or two vector spaces). The word homomorphism comes from the Ancient Greek language:  meaning "same" and  meaning "form" or "shape". However, the word was apparently introduced to mathematics due to a (mis)translation of German  meaning "similar" to  meaning "same". The term "homomorphism" appeared as early as 1892, when it was attributed to the German mathematician Felix Klein (1849–1925).

Homomorphisms of vector spaces are also called linear maps, and their study is the subject of linear algebra.

The concept of homomorphism has been generalized, under the name of morphism, to many other structures that either do not have an underlying set, or are not algebraic. This generalization is the starting point of category theory.

A homomorphism may also be an isomorphism, an endomorphism, an automorphism, etc. (see below). Each of those can be defined in a way that may be generalized to any class of morphisms.

Definition 
A homomorphism is a map between two algebraic structures of the same type (that is of the same name), that preserves the operations of the structures. This means a map  between two sets ,  equipped with the same structure such that, if  is an operation of the structure (supposed here, for simplification, to be a binary operation), then

One says often that  preserves the operation or is compatible with the operation.

Formally, a map  preserves an operation  of arity , defined on both  and  if 
 

The operations that must be preserved by a homomorphism include 0-ary operations, that is the constants. In particular, when an identity element is required by the type of structure, the identity element of the first structure must be mapped to the corresponding identity element of the second structure.

For example:

 A semigroup homomorphism is a map between semigroups that preserves the semigroup operation.
 A monoid homomorphism is a map between monoids that preserves the monoid operation and maps the identity element of the first monoid to that of the second monoid (the identity element is a 0-ary operation).
 A group homomorphism is a map between groups that preserves the group operation. This implies that the group homomorphism maps the identity element of the first group to the identity element of the second group, and maps the inverse of an element of the first group  to the inverse of the image of this element. Thus a semigroup homomorphism between groups is necessarily a group homomorphism.
 A ring homomorphism is a map between rings that preserves the ring addition, the ring multiplication, and the multiplicative identity. Whether the multiplicative identity is to be preserved depends upon the definition of ring in use. If the multiplicative identity is not preserved, one has a rng homomorphism.
 A linear map is a homomorphism of vector spaces; that is, a group homomorphism between vector spaces that preserves the abelian group structure and scalar multiplication.
 A module homomorphism, also called a linear map between modules, is defined similarly.
 An algebra homomorphism is a map that preserves the algebra operations.

An algebraic structure may have more than one operation, and a homomorphism is required to preserve each operation. Thus a map that preserves only some of the operations is not a homomorphism of the structure, but only a homomorphism of the substructure obtained by considering only the preserved operations. For example, a map between monoids that preserves the monoid operation and not the identity element, is not a monoid homomorphism, but only a semigroup homomorphism.

The notation for the operations does not need to be the same in the source and the target of a homomorphism. For example, the real numbers form a group for addition, and the positive real numbers form a group for multiplication. The exponential function 

satisfies

and is thus a homomorphism between these two groups. It is even an isomorphism (see below), as its inverse function, the natural logarithm, satisfies 

and is also a group homomorphism.

Examples 

The real numbers are a ring, having both addition and multiplication.  The set of all 2×2 matrices is also a ring, under matrix addition and matrix multiplication.  If we define a function between these rings as follows:

where  is a real number, then  is a homomorphism of rings, since  preserves both addition:

and multiplication:

For another example, the nonzero complex numbers form a group under the operation of multiplication, as do the nonzero real numbers.  (Zero must be excluded from both groups since it does not have a multiplicative inverse, which is required for elements of a group.)  Define a function  from the nonzero complex numbers to the nonzero real numbers by

That is,  is the absolute value (or modulus) of the complex number .  Then  is a homomorphism of groups, since it preserves multiplication:

Note that  cannot be extended to a homomorphism of rings (from the complex numbers to the real numbers), since it does not preserve addition:

As another example, the diagram shows a monoid homomorphism  from the monoid  to the monoid .

Special homomorphisms 
Several kinds of homomorphisms have a specific name, which is also defined for general morphisms.

Isomorphism 
An isomorphism between algebraic structures of the same type is commonly defined as a bijective homomorphism. 

In the more general context of category theory, an isomorphism is defined as a morphism that has an inverse that is also a morphism. In the specific case of algebraic structures, the two definitions are equivalent, although they may differ for non-algebraic structures, which have an underlying set.

More precisely, if 

is a (homo)morphism, it has an inverse if there exists a homomorphism

such that

If  and  have underlying sets, and  has an inverse , then  is bijective.

Conversely, if  is a bijective homomorphism between algebraic structures, let  be the map such that  is the unique element  of  such that . One has  and it remains only to show that  is a homomorphism.

This proof does not work for non-algebraic structures. For example, for topological spaces, a morphism is a continuous map, and the inverse of a bijective continuous map is not necessarily continuous. An isomorphism of topological spaces, called homeomorphism or bicontinuous map, is thus a bijective continuous map, whose inverse is also continuous.

Endomorphism
An endomorphism is a homomorphism whose domain equals the codomain, or, more generally, a morphism whose source is equal to its target.

The endomorphisms of an algebraic structure, or of an object of a category form a monoid under composition.

The endomorphisms of a vector space or of a module form a ring. In the case of a vector space or a free module of finite dimension, the choice of a basis induces a ring isomorphism between the ring of endomorphisms and the ring of square matrices of the same dimension.

Automorphism

An automorphism is an endomorphism that is also an isomorphism.

The automorphisms of an algebraic structure or of an object of a category form a group under composition, which is called the automorphism group of the structure.

Many groups that have received a name are automorphism groups of some algebraic structure. For example, the general linear group  is the automorphism group of a vector space of dimension  over a field .

The automorphism groups of fields were introduced by Évariste Galois for studying the roots of polynomials, and are the basis of Galois theory.

Monomorphism
For algebraic structures, monomorphisms are commonly defined as injective homomorphisms. 

In the more general context of category theory, a monomorphism is defined as a morphism that is left cancelable.

These two definitions of monomorphism are equivalent for all common algebraic structures. More precisely, they are equivalent for fields, for which every homomorphism is a monomorphism, and for varieties of universal algebra, that is algebraic structures for which operations and axioms (identities) are defined without any restriction (the fields do not form a variety, as the multiplicative inverse is defined either as a unary operation or as a property of the multiplication, which are, in both cases, defined only for nonzero elements).

In particular, the two definitions of a monomorphism are equivalent for sets, magmas, semigroups, monoids, groups, rings, fields, vector spaces and modules.

A split monomorphism is a homomorphism that has a left inverse and thus it is itself a right inverse of that other homomorphism. That is, a homomorphism  is a split monomorphism if there exists a homomorphism  such that  A split monomorphism is always a monomorphism, for both meanings of monomorphism. For sets and vector spaces, every monomorphism is a split monomorphism, but this property does not hold for most common algebraic structures.

If  is injective, then , and thus . This proof works not only for algebraic structures, but also for any category whose objects are sets and arrows are maps between these sets. For example, an injective continuous map is a monomorphism in the category of topological spaces.

As , one has  by the uniqueness in the definition of a universal property. As  is left cancelable, one has , and thus . Therefore,  is injective.

Two such formulas are said equivalent if one may pass from one to the other by applying the axioms (identities of the structure). This defines an equivalence relation, if the identities are not subject to conditions, that is if one works with a variety.

Epimorphism

In algebra, epimorphisms are often defined as surjective homomorphisms. On the other hand, in category theory, epimorphisms are defined as right cancelable morphisms.

A surjective homomorphism is always right cancelable, but the converse is not always true for algebraic structures. However, the two definitions of epimorphism are equivalent for sets, vector spaces, abelian groups, modules (see below for a proof), and groups. The importance of these structures in all mathematics, especially in linear algebra and homological algebra, may explain the coexistence of two non-equivalent definitions.

Algebraic structures for which there exist non-surjective epimorphisms include semigroups and rings. The most basic example is the inclusion of integers into rational numbers, which is a homomorphism of rings and of multiplicative semigroups. For both structures it is a monomorphism and a non-surjective epimorphism, but not an isomorphism.

A wide generalization of this example is the localization of a ring by a multiplicative set. Every localization is a ring epimorphism, which is not, in general, surjective. As localizations are fundamental in commutative algebra and algebraic geometry, this may explain why in these areas, the definition of epimorphisms as right cancelable homomorphisms is generally preferred.

A split epimorphism is a homomorphism that has a right inverse and thus it is itself a left inverse of that other homomorphism. That is, a homomorphism  is a split epimorphism if there exists a homomorphism  such that  A split epimorphism is always an epimorphism, for both meanings of epimorphism. For sets and vector spaces, every epimorphism is a split epimorphism, but this property does not hold for most common algebraic structures.

In summary, one has 
 
the last implication is an equivalence for sets, vector spaces, modules, abelian groups, and groups; the first implication is an equivalence for sets and vector spaces.

Let  be a homomorphism. We want to prove that if it is not surjective, it is not right cancelable.

Let  be the zero map. If  is not surjective, and thus  (one is a zero map, while the other is not).

Kernel 

When the algebraic structure is a  group for some operation, the equivalence class  of the identity element of this operation suffices to characterize the equivalence relation. The kernels of homomorphisms of a given type of algebraic structure are naturally equipped with some structure. This structure type of the kernels is the same as the considered structure, in the case of abelian groups, vector spaces and modules, but is different and has received a specific name in other cases, such as normal subgroup for kernels of group homomorphisms and ideals for kernels of ring homomorphisms (in the case of non-commutative rings, the kernels are the two-sided ideals).

Relational structures 

In model theory, the notion of an algebraic structure is generalized to structures involving both operations and relations. Let L be a signature consisting of function and relation symbols, and A, B be two L-structures. Then a homomorphism from A to B is a mapping h from the domain of A to the domain of B such that
 h(FA(a1,…,an)) = FB(h(a1),…,h(an)) for each n-ary function symbol F in L,
 RA(a1,…,an) implies RB(h(a1),…,h(an)) for each n-ary relation symbol R in L.
In the special case with just one binary relation, we obtain the notion of a graph homomorphism.

Formal language theory
Homomorphisms are also used in the study of formal languages and are often briefly referred to as morphisms.

A homomorphism  on  that satisfies  for all  is called a -uniform homomorphism. If  for all  (that is,  is 1-uniform), then  is also called a coding or a projection.

Here the monoid operation is concatenation and the identity element is the empty word. From this perspective, a language homomorphism is precisely a monoid homomorphism.

See also
 Diffeomorphism
 Homomorphic encryption
 Homomorphic secret sharing – a simplistic decentralized voting protocol
 Morphism
 Quasimorphism

Notes

Citations

References
 

Morphisms